David A. Snow is a Distinguished Professor of Sociology at the University of California, Irvine.

Intellectual Contributions
Snow's research constitutes one of the most original and groundbreaking bodies of work in the discipline.    While it addresses a number of discrete theoretical and empirical problems, it has the common goal of creating general conceptual tools to comprehend the dynamics of everyday social interaction.  Snow’s influence is particularly deep in two areas of the discipline: social movements and social inequality.

Perhaps Snow’s single greatest scholarly achievement is the creation of the “framing perspective” on social movements, which focuses on the negotiable and emergent meanings of social-movement issues, tactics, and participants.  Snow’s approach is more social psychological and agency-centered than competing perspectives.  The framing perspective focuses attention on the signifying work or meaning construction engaged in by movement adherents (e.g., leaders, activists, and rank-and-file participants) and other actors (e.g., adversaries, institutional elites, media, counter movements) relevant to the interests of movements and the challenges they mount in pursuit of those interests. Snow's work problematizes the meanings associated with relevant events, activities, places, and actors, suggesting that those meanings are typically contestable and negotiable and thus open to debate and differential interpretation. From this vantage point, mobilizing grievances are seen neither as naturally occurring sentiments nor as arising automatically from specifiable material conditions, but as the result of interactively-based interpretation or signifying work.

Snow’s research on social inequality focuses on the social psychology of extreme poverty and homelessness.  In his best-known work in this area, Down on Their Luck (University of California Press 1993, Portuguese translation 1998), Snow and co-author (and former student) Leon Anderson examine the everyday challenges faced by homeless men and women, using data from hundreds of hours of interviews, participant observation, and social service agencies.  On this unique and expansive empirical base, Snow and Anderson reveal who the homeless are, how they live, and why they have ended up on the streets.  They debunk several popular myths of the homeless with their portrayal of adaptive, resourceful, and pragmatic men and women.  Among the book’s many honors, Down on Their Luck earned a place on a list of the best ethnographies published between 1950 and 2000 by the journal Contemporary Sociology.

Honors and awards
Snow has received multiple honors and awards for his work.  The Society for the Study of Social Problems awarded Snow the Lee Founders Award for his career contributions to the study of social problems in 2008.  In 2011, he earned UCI’s highest campus-level distinction for faculty, Distinguished Professor.  In 2012, the UCI Alumni Association granted Snow the Lauds & Laurels Award for Outstanding Faculty Achievement.  In 2013, Snow won the McCarthy Award from the Center for the Study of Social Movements at the University of Notre Dame.

Education, Teaching, and Service
Born in Saginaw Michigan, Snow received his Ph.D. in sociology from the University of California, Los Angeles in 1976.  He has taught at Southern Methodist University; University of Texas, Austin; University of Arizona; and since 2001 at the University of California, Irvine.

At UC Irvine, Snow has been the co-director for the Center for Citizen Peace Building, which supports research and community-based activities aimed at discouraging conflict and violence. Under his co-direction, the center helped to establish the Olive Tree Initiative. He also supported the launching of a Youth and Gang Violence Intervention Training Program which hosted its inaugural class in March 2012. In addition, he is a member of the UCI Center for Ethnography; Center for Global Peace and Conflict Studies; Center for Research on Immigration, Population and Public Policy; and Center for the Study of Democracy.

Snow has served as the vice president of the American Sociological Association (2010–2011) and as the president of the Society for the Study of Symbolic Interaction and the Pacific Sociological Association.

Selected books
 D. A. Snow and L. Anderson. 1993. Down on Their Luck: A Study of Homeless Street People. Berkeley, CA: University of California Press.
 D. A. Snow and S. A. Soule. 2010. A Primer on Social Movements. New York: W.W. Norton & Co.
 D. A. Snow, S. Soule, H. Kriesi (eds.) 2004.  The Blackwell Companion to Social Movements. Oxford, UK: Blackwell Publishers.
 D. A. Snow, D. della Porta, B. Klandermans. D. McAdam (eds.). 2013. Encyclopedia of Social and Political Movements. London: Wiley-Blackwell.

Articles or Book Chapters
 Snow, D.A., L. Zurcher, and S. Ekland-Olson. 1980. "Social Networks and Social Movements: A Microstructural Approach to Differential Recruitment." American Sociological Review 45 : 787-801.
 Snow, D. A., Rochford Jr., B., Worden, S. K. and Benford, R. D. 1986. Frame Alignment Processes, Micromobilization, and Movement Participation. American Sociological Review, 51, 464-481.
 Snow, D. A. and Benford, R.D. 1992. Master Frames and Cycles of Protest. In A. D. Morris and C. M. Mueller (eds.), Frontiers in Social Movement Theory. Yale University Press,  New Haven, CT, pp. 133–155.
 Snow, D. A. 2004. Framing Processes, Ideology, and Discursive Fields. In: Snow, D.A., Soule, S.A. & Kriesi, H. (eds.) The Blackwell Companion to Social Movements.  Blackwell Publishing, Oxford, pp. 380–412.

References

External links 
http://www.faculty.uci.edu/profile.cfm?faculty_id=4669

American sociologists
University of California, Irvine faculty
Living people
Year of birth missing (living people)